is a Japanese  television drama series, first broadcast on TBS in 2009 and a second season in 2011.  It is based on the Japanese manga series, Jin, written by Motoka Murakami.

It was one of the most popular dramas of the year and won many major awards.

Plot

Season 1
The story follows a brain surgeon named Jin Minakata who has spent the last two years in anguish, as his fiancee, Miki, herself a doctor, lies in a vegetative state after an operation he performed. One day, he is knocked unconscious by a panicking patient at the hospital and awakens to find himself transported back in time to the Edo period. He is soon attacked by a samurai, but he escapes with the help of a man named Kyōtarō Tachibana. Kyōtarō suffers a serious injury to the head while trying to protect him, but Jin manages to save his life despite a lack of proper medical equipment. Because of that, Kyōtarō's sister Saki begins taking an interest in Jin and becomes his assistant. Meanwhile, Jin is determined to find a way back to the present.

Season 2
Two years have passed since the last season. Jin and Saki develop a sweet confectionery that contains medicine for Saki's mother who has a severe case of beriberi. Meanwhile, Ryoma asks Jin to care for Kaishuu Katsu's mentor, Shozan Sakuma. Shōzan is in a critical state after being attacked by the Shinsengumi. Jin is reluctant because curing Shozan would mean changing the course of history. However, Shōzan tells him that he too is involved in the “present”.

Cast

Takao Osawa as Jin Minakata
Haruka Ayase as Saki Tachibana
Miki Nakatani as Miki Tomonaga / Nokaze
Keisuke Koide as Kyōtarō Tachibana
Yumi Asō as Ei Tachibana
Masaaki Uchino as Ryōma Sakamoto
Fumiyo Kohinata as Rintarō Katsu
Takahiro Fujimoto as Kichinosuke Saigō
Kazufumi Miyazawa as Isami Kondō
Kazuyuki Asano as Hisashige Tanaka
Tomoka Kurokawa as Princess Kazu
Tetsuya Takeda as Kōan Ogata
Masachika Ichimura as Shōzan Sakuma
Kenta Kiritani as Yūsuke Saburi
Hiromasa Taguchi as Jun'an Yamada
Jirō Satō as Genkō Fukuda
Atsuo Nakamura as Tatsugorō Shinmon

Music
Ending:
  by Misia (Season 1)
  by Ken Hirai (Season 2)

Awards

Jin 1

Jin 2

References

External links
 TBS "Jin" (Season 1) Official website
 TBS "Jin" (Season 2) Official website
 Review: Jin (TBS, 2009), The Little Dorama Girl

2009 Japanese television series debuts
2011 Japanese television series endings
Japanese television dramas based on manga
Nichiyō Gekijō
Jidaigeki television series
Japanese medical television series
Japanese time travel television series
Television shows set in Tokyo
Jin (manga)